Neoascia obliqua is a Palearctic species of hoverfly.

Description
 External images
For terms see Morphology of Diptera
The 3rd segment of the antenna is elongated-oval as in N. podagrica F.
(length exceeding width by 2.0 to 2.5). Yellow spots along sides of tergite 4 are absent. Surstyli are irregularly trapezoidal.

Distribution
Scandinavia South to the Pyrenees. Ireland East through Central Europe, European Russia , Yugoslavia and the Caucasus.

Habitat
Wetlands and wet places with tall herb communities.

Biology
Flies among vegetation along the water's edge from the end of Aprilto th beginning of August. Flowers visited white umbellifers, Galium,
Ranunculus, Taraxacum.

References

Diptera of Europe
Eristalinae
Insects described in 1940